There are many Grade II listed buildings in the county of Dorset. This is a list of them.

Bournemouth 

 Bournemouth Community Hebrew Congregation
 Bournemouth Gardens
 Bournemouth Town Hall
 East Cliff Church
Pavilion Theatre
Royal Bath Hotel
Royal Exeter Hotel
St Alban's Church
St Augustin's Church
St Mark's Church
St. Mark's School
Wimborne Road Cemetery

Christchurch 
Listed buildings in Christchurch, Dorset#Grade II

 The Town Hall, Christchurch

North Dorset 

 Lady Wimborne Bridge

Poole 

 Crown Hotel
Poole Civic Centre

Purbeck 

 Clavell Tower
Castle Inn
Fort Henry
Square and Compass, Worth Matravers
Swanage Town Hall

West Dorset 

 Beaminster Tunnel
 Bridport Arts Centre
Dorset Martyrs Memorial
Pier Terrace, West Bay
Thomas Hardy Statue
Three Cups Hotel
Town Walks, Dorchester

Weymouth and Portland 

 Brewers Quay (since 1974)
 Custom House
Jubilee Clock Tower
Mulberry Harbour Phoenix Units
Old Higher Lighthouse
Old Lower Lighthouse
Pennsylvania Castle
Portland Bill Lighthouse
Portland Cenotaph
Portland House, Weymouth
Portland Windmills
Portwey Hospital
Riviera Hotel, Weymouth
Rossi's
Royal Hotel, Weymouth
St George's Centre
Statue of Queen Victoria, Weymouth
The Captain's House
The Cove House Inn
The George Inn, Portland
The Old Engine Shed, Portland
Trinity House Obelisk
Verne Cistern
Verne High Angle Battery
Wellington Court
Weymouth Old Town Hall
Weymouth Town Bridge
Wyke Castle
Wyke Regis War Memorial

See also 

 Grade I listed buildings in Dorset
 Grade II* listed buildings in Dorset

Lists of Grade II listed buildings in England by county
Lists of listed buildings in Dorset